The Deregulation and Contracting Out Act 1994 (c. 40) is an Act of Parliament. It introduced wide-ranging measures with aims including reducing burdern on people in trade created by previous Acts such as the Shops Act 1950, changes in transport legislation, changes in utility legislation, changes in financial services among others.

It also contained so called Henry VIII clauses, which meant ministers could amend previous primary legislation through order (i.e. drafted by the Secretary of State without a vote in Parliament).

The Act was largely repealed and replaced by the Regulatory Reform Act 2001.

Repeals 
The following Acts were entirely repealed by this Act:

 Shops Act 1950
 Shops (Airports) Act 1962
 Shops (Early Closing Days) Act 1965

The following Acts were partially repealed by this Act:

 Merchant Shipping Act 1894
 Licensing Act 1964
 Transport Act 1968
 Post Office Act 1969
 Local Government Act 1972
 Employment Agencies Act 1973
 Fair Trading Act 1973
 Local Government (Scotland) Act 1973
 Road Traffic Act 1974
 House of Commons Disqualification Act 1975
 Employment Protection Act 1975
 Industrial Relations (Northern Ireland) Order 1976
 Employment Protection (Consolidation) Act 1978
 Merchant Shipping Act 1979
 Competition Act 1980
 Local Government, Planning and Land Act 1980
 Public Passenger Vehicles Act 1981
 Employment (Miscellaneous Provisions) (Northern Ireland) Order 1981
 Transport Act 1982
 Telecommunications Act 1984
 Road Traffic Regulation Act 1984
 London Regional Transport Act 1984
 Cinemas Act 1985
 Insolvency Act 1985
 Transport Act 1985
 Weights and Measures Act 1985
 Gas Act 1986
 Building Societies Act 1986
 Financial Services Act 1986
 Income and Corporation Taxes Act 1988
 Road Traffic (Consequential Provisions) Act 1988
 Electricity Act 1989
 Employment Act 1989
 Companies Act 1989
 Environmental Protection Act 1990
 Companies (Northern Ireland) Order 1990
 Charities Act 1992
 Electricity (Northern Ireland) Order 1992
 Charities Act 1993
 Trade Union Reform and Employment Rights Act 1993
 Railways Act 1993
 Sunday Trading Act 1994

References

External links

United Kingdom Acts of Parliament 1994
Economics of regulation
Economic liberalization